Hachette is a French publisher. Founded in 1826 by Louis Hachette as Brédif, the company later became L. Hachette et Compagnie, Librairie Hachette, Hachette SA and Hachette Livre in France. After acquiring an Australian publisher, Hachette Australia was created; in the UK it became Hachette UK, and its expansion into the United States became Hachette Book Group USA.

History

France
It was founded in 1826 by Louis Hachette as Brédif, a bookshop and publishing company. It became L. Hachette et Compagnie on 1 January 1846, Librairie Hachette in 1919, and Hachette SA in 1977. It was acquired by the Lagardère Group in 1981. In 1992, the publishing assets of Hachette SA were grouped into a subsidiary called Hachette Livre, the flagship imprint of Lagardère Publishing. Hachette has its headquarters in the 15th arrondissement of Paris. In 1996, it merged with the Hatier group. In 2004, Hachette acquired dictionary publisher Éditions Larousse.

International expansion
In 2002, UK publisher John Murray was acquired by Hodder Headline, which was itself acquired in 2004 by the Lagardère Group. Since then, it has been an imprint under Lagardère brand known as Hachette UK.

In 2004, Lagardère acquired Australian publisher Hodder Headline for Hachette Livre, who renamed it Hachette Australia.

In 2006, it expanded into the United States when it purchased Time Warner's book-publishing division, which was then renamed Hachette Book Group USA. Part of Time Warner's holdings was Australian independent publishing house Lothian Books, which was incorporated as an imprint.

In June 2013, Hachette announced that it would acquire the adult trade business of Hyperion Books from Disney. (Disney retained the young adult business and books related to existing Disney–ABC TV properties, under an expanded Disney–Hyperion imprint.)

In 2018, it announced its Robinson Millenials label, under which it would be publishing webcomics in partnership with Hiveworks Comics.

Hachette UK acquired Laurence King Publishing, original publisher of adult colouring book author and illustrator Johanna Basford, in August 2020.

Corporate affairs
Hachette has its headquarters in the Beaugrenelle district in the 15th arrondissement of Paris.

Hachette's head office previously occupied a building at the intersection of the Boulevards Saint-Germain and Saint-Michel in the Saint-Germain-des-Prés area. It later moved to its current location.

In June 2014, the company's U.S. affiliate in conjunction with Perseus Books Group, and Ingram Content Group, announced a three-way deal whereby Hachette would buy Perseus and then sell the company's client services businesses to Ingram. Financial details of the deal were not disclosed. However, in August 2014, the deal was called off because Hachette and the other parties involved decided the deal was too complicated. The deal eventually went through in April 2016 with Perseus's publishing assets and imprints going to Hachette, and distribution assets to Ingram.

Company structure
Hachette Livre is involved in three core businesses: publishing, partworks and distribution.

Publishing
Hachette Livre has book publishing operations in their native France, as well as in Spain, Latin and North America (the former mostly in Mexico), the United Kingdom, the Republic of Ireland, Russia, Australia, New Zealand, India, China, the Arab world (mostly in Lebanon and Morocco) and Francophone sub-saharan Africa.

Partworks
Hachette distributes partworks to France, Belgium, Switzerland, Canada, Spain, Portugal, Brazil, Argentina, Uruguay, Ecuador, Chile, Colombia, Mexico, Peru, the United Kingdom, the Republic of Ireland, Australia, New Zealand, South Africa, Italy, Greece, Germany, Austria, Poland, Japan, Taiwan, Hong Kong, Russia, the Czech Republic, Romania, Slovakia, Belarus, Croatia, Hungary and Bulgaria.

Hachette Collections (France; also distributed in Francophone parts of Belgium, Switzerland and Canada)
Kolekcja Hachette (Poland)
Hachette Partworks Ltd. (United Kingdom)
Hachette Kollektsia (Russia)
Hachette Fascicoli (Italy; also distributed in Greece, Romania, the Czech Republic, Slovakia, Croatia, Hungary and Bulgaria)
Hachette Collections Japan
Editorial Salvat (Spain and Latin America)

Distribution

Hachette Livre Distribution (France)
Dilibel (Belgium)
Diffulivre (Switzerland)
Hachette Canada
Lightning Source France (joint venture with Lightning Source)
Bookpoint (United Kingdom)
Hachette UK Distribution
Alliance Distribution Services (Australia)
HBG Cilent Services (United States)
Comercial Grupo Anaya (Spain)

See also
 Books in France
 Hachette Books
 Hachette Book Group

Notes and references

Further reading
History of Hachette Australia (includes acquisitions and changes, from 1726 UK John Murray through to 2015)

External links

 

 01
Book publishing companies of France
French speculative fiction publishers
Companies based in Paris
Publishing companies established in 1826
French companies established in 1826
Mass media in Paris
Lagardère Active
Reference publishers